The trolleybus system in Manchester, England, opened on , and gradually replaced certain routes of the Manchester tramway network. Manchester was a belated convert to trolleybuses having already started a programme of tram to diesel bus conversion in the mid-1930s and this, overall, continued to be the preferred option for tram conversion that was completed in 1949.

By the standards of the various now defunct trolleybus systems in the United Kingdom, the Manchester system was a large one, with a total of 9 routes, and a maximum fleet of 189 trolleybuses.

Manchester's trolleybuses were also on certain routes jointly operated with the Ashton-under-Lyne trolleybus system, between 1925 and 1966.

Two former Manchester trolleybuses are preserved, one at the Greater Manchester Transport Museum, Cheetham Hill, and another at the Trolleybus Museum in Sandtoft, Lincolnshire.

See also

History of Manchester
Transport in Manchester
List of trolleybus systems in the United Kingdom

References

Notes

Further reading

External links

SCT'61 website - photos and descriptions of Manchester trolleybuses and early motorbuses
National Trolleybus Archive
British Trolleybus Society, based in Reading
National Trolleybus Association, based in London

Transport in Manchester
Manchester
Manchester
History of transport in Greater Manchester